The Kosmos-1 (GRAU Index: 65S3, also known as Cosmos-1) was a Soviet carrier rocket (Kosmos (rocket family)), derived from the R-14 missile, which orbited satellites in 1964 and 1965. It served as an interim, and was quickly replaced by the Kosmos-3. Eight were flown, all launched from Site 41/15 at the Baikonur Cosmodrome.

Initial development was authorised in October 1961, leading to a maiden flight on 18 August 1964, carrying three Strela satellites. Strela-1 satellites were flown on seven flights, three on each of the first four and five on the next three. The eighth and final  flight carried one. All flights were successful except the second.

Launch history

See also
Kosmos-2I
Kosmos-3M

References

Space launch vehicles of the Soviet Union
Vehicles introduced in 1964
1964 in spaceflight
1965 in spaceflight